Thomas Walker (born 1903) was a Scottish professional footballer who played as a right back.

Career
Born in Cross Colls, Walker played for Vale of Grange, Bradford City and Sheffield Wednesday. For Bradford City, he made 54 appearances in the Football League; he also made 4 FA Cup appearances. For Sheffield Wednesday, he made 258 appearances in the Football League; he also made 29 FA Cup appearances. He played in Sheffield Wednesday's 2–1 defeat by Arsenal in the Charity Shield at Stamford Bridge in October 1930.

Sources

References

1903 births
Year of death missing
Scottish footballers
Bradford City A.F.C. players
Sheffield Wednesday F.C. players
English Football League players
Association football fullbacks